USS Wasp may refer to the following ships of the Continental and United States navies: 

 was a merchant schooner purchased by the Continental Navy in late 1775 and destroyed in 1777
 was a sloop constructed in 1806 and captured during the War of 1812
 was a schooner built in 1810 and sold after 1814
 was a sloop chartered in 1813 and returned to her owners in 1814
 was a sloop-of-war constructed in 1813 and lost in a storm at sea in 1814.
, originally the captured Confederate Emma Henry, renamed Wasp in June 1865 and found unfit for further service in 1876
, was the first steam yacht Columbia launched 1893 by William Cramp, acquired and commissioned in 1898 by the Navy and used as a training ship until sold in 1919
, a steel-hulled motorboat, was leased by the U.S. Navy and performed patrol duties in 1917
 an aircraft carrier launched in 1943 and served until 1972
 is lead ship of the s and was launched in 1989 and in active service

United States Navy ship names